Brigadier General Joseph Alfred Gaston (September 2, 1856 – March 31, 1937) was a United States Army officer in the late 19th and early 20th centuries. He served in the Spanish–American War, among other incidents and conflicts.

Early life
Gaston was born on September 2, 1856, in Honey Brook, Pennsylvania. He attended Wyoming Seminary and Pennsylvania's Commercial College. Afterward, he entered the United States Military Academy, graduating in 1881 and being commissioned into the 8th Cavalry Regiment.

Career 
From 1881 to 1891, Gaston served on frontier duty, which mainly involved military actions against the Apache and Sioux. He participated in the Spanish–American War, serving in Cuba from 1899 to 1902, and he later went to the Philippines. Gaston commanded permanent relief camps after the 1906 San Francisco earthquake. He graduated from the United States Army War College in 1912, and between November 1913 and April 1914, after traveling again to the Philippines between 1908 and 1910, he commanded the Cavalry School at Fort Riley. Gaston later commanded the 6th Cavalry Regiment and served at the border with Mexico and on the Pancho Villa Expedition in that capacity.

Gaston was promoted to the rank of brigadier general on August 5, 1917, and assumed command over the 165th Depot Brigade at Fort Travis in Texas. He commanded the 19th Division, then the 90th Division from November 23 to December 27, 1917. He commanded the 74th Infantry Brigade, a unit of the 37th Division. From January to March 1918, he commanded the 11th Infantry Brigade, a unit of the 6th Division. He was commander of the 37th Division from April 25 to May 8, 1918. He commanded Camp Meade, Maryland, from June 1918 to February 5, 1919. In August 1918, he commanded the 11th Division.

After reverting to his permanent rank of colonel, Gaston did recruiting duty in Philadelphia. He retired from the Army on September 2, 1920. Congress restored Gaston's brigadier general rank in June 1930.

Death and legacy 
He died on March 31, 1937. He is buried at Arlington National Cemetery.

Personal life
Gaston married Lavinia Haskin (1866-1944), the daughter of Brigadier General William L. Haskin, on May 16, 1903.

References

Bibliography

1856 births
1937 deaths
People from Honey Brook, Pennsylvania
American military personnel of the Spanish–American War
United States Army generals
United States Military Academy alumni
United States Army War College alumni
Burials at Arlington National Cemetery
United States Army generals of World War I
Wyoming Seminary alumni
1906 San Francisco earthquake
Military personnel from Pennsylvania
United States Army Cavalry Branch personnel